Allocasuarina zephyrea, commonly known as the western sheoak or western scrub sheoak, is a shrub of the genus Allocasuarina native to Tasmania. It is a common and widespread shrub occurring in Central and Western Tasmania.

It flowers throughout the year producing flowers that are red tufts of stigma and later forming nut-like fruit. The plant will grow in sandy soils and is found among coastal vegetation or in heath throughout Tasmania from Burnie in the north, through the Central Highlands to Huon Valley in the south.

Etymology 
The species was first formally described by the botanist Lawrence Alexander Sidney Johnson in Published in 1989 in the work Casuarinaceae. Flora of Australia. The genus Allocasuarina and family Casuarinaceae derive from 'cassowary', referring to the long, thin cladodes which resemble cassowary feathers. 'Zephyrea' is derived from the Greek zephyros ('the west wind'), referring to its occurrence on the western side of Tasmania.

Description 
Allocasuarina zephyrea is a dioecious shrub with branchlets growing up to 19 cm long and resembling pine needles. These branchlets are cladodes with whorls of tiny scale leaves which encircle each joint of the branchlet. Its flowers are small, rust-red inflorescences. Male inflorescences are rust-red spikes 1-3.5 cm long with 5-7 whorls per cm, with anthers are 0.7-0.9mm long.  Female inflorescences produce 10-25mm woody, cone-like fruit, with many valves which open to allow its samara to be wind-dispersed.

Discriminating characteristics 
A. zephyrea is closely related to Allocasuarina monolifera, A. duncanii and A. crassa. It is usually distinguishable by its thinner branchlets and smaller cones.

Habitat and distribution 
A. zephyrea is endemic to Tasmania, occurring in a wide range of habitat from  western lowlands to central and south-eastern highlands, and King Island. It is found primarily in woodlands, heath and heathy sedgelands. It is most suited to moist but well-drained areas. A. zephyrea  is well-adapted to low-nutrient and sandy soils, in part due to nodules on its roots which contain symbiotic nitrogen-fixing bacteria. It is a hardy shrub tolerant of frost, drought, exposed, rocky and windy conditions.

Uses

Propagation 
Direct seeding is possible; however, seeds lose viability quickly if not stored at a low temperature. It is possible to grow A. zephyrea from cuttings. Seeds germinate between 10–45 days.

Threats and conservation 
A. zephyrea is susceptible to browsing by rabbits and hares. It is listed as 'Not Threatened' under the Natural Values Atlas.

References

External links
  Occurrence data for Allocasuarina zephyrea from The Australasian Virtual Herbarium
 Flora of Tasmania Key to the Casuarinaceae (of Tasmania) 
 Allocasuarina zephyrea from Key to Tasmanian Dicots 

zephyrea
Flora of Tasmania
Fagales of Australia
Plants described in 1989